Bunster is an Irish surname. People with this name include:

 Arthur Bunster (1827–1891), historical Member of Parliament from British Columbia, Canada
 Claudio Bunster (Teitelboim) Weitzman (born 1947), Chilean scientist
 Enrique Bunster (1912–1976), Chilean novelist and playwright
 Jorge Bunster (born 1953), Chilean businessman and politician
 Rolando Gonzalez-Bunster (born c. 1949), US-based Argentine businessman
 Marta Bunster, Chilean chemist

See also 
 Bunster Hill, in Dovedale, England
 Bunster Range, a small mountain range in southwestern British Columbia, Canada

Surnames of Irish origin